The Ignace Bourget Monument is a monument of Louis-Philippe Hébert located in front of Montreal's Mary, Queen of the World Cathedral, in Quebec, Canada.

Overview  

The monument in memory of Bishop Ignace Bourget was unveiled on June 24, 1903, in front of the replica of St. Peter's Basilica in Rome, which he had built. A bas-relief shows the bishop studying the plans for the building. Two allegorical statues represent Religion and Charity. It was erected by both clergy and faithful, who contributed $25,000. The sculptures and bas-reliefs were created by Louis-Philippe Hébert.

Allegorical statues

Bas-reliefs

References 

 MP-0000.871.4 | Monument of Bishop Ignace Bourget, Dorchester Street, Montreal, QC, about 1907 

 
1903 in Canada
1903 sculptures
Allegorical sculptures in Canada
Bronze sculptures in Canada
Buildings and structures completed in 1903 
Cultural depictions of Canadian men
Cultural depictions of religious leaders
Downtown Montreal
History of Montreal
Monuments and memorials in Montreal
Outdoor sculptures in Montreal
Sculptures by Louis-Philippe Hébert 
Sculptures of men in Canada
Sculptures of women in Canada
Statues in Canada
Statues of religious leaders